ACTFL (American Council on the Teaching of Foreign Languages) is an organization aiming to improve and expand the teaching and learning of all languages at all levels of instruction.  ACTFL is an individual membership organization of more than 13,000 language educators and administrators from elementary through graduate education, as well as in government and industry.

Founded in 1967 as a small offshoot of the Modern Language Association (MLA), ACTFL quickly became both a resource and a haven for language educators. Since then, the organization has set industry standards, established proficiency guidelines, advocated for language education funding, and connected colleagues at the ACTFL Annual Convention.

ACTFL language proficiency guidelines 
The ACTFL Proficiency Guidelines provide a means of assessing the proficiency of a foreign language speaker. It is widely used in schools and universities in the United States and the ACTFL Oral Proficiency Interview is the most widely used oral proficiency test in North America.

The guidelines are broken up into different proficiency levels:

 novice – subdivided into low (NL), mid (NM), and high (NH)
 intermediate – subdivided into low (IL), mid (IM), and high (IH)
 advanced – subdivided into low (AL), mid (AM), and high (AH)
 superior (S)
 distinguished (D)

These proficiency levels are defined separately for ability to listen, speak, read and write. Thus, in those American programs that emphasize written language over spoken, students may reach the advanced level in reading and writing while remaining at a lower level in listening and speaking.

The ACTFL Performance Descriptors are defined in three different subsets of communications skills with their own more generalized grading scales in terms of domains, functions, contexts/ content, text type, language control, vocabulary, communication strategies, cultural awareness in all of the following modes of communication:

Interpersonal (Novice, Intermediate, and Advanced)
Interpretative (Novice, Intermediate, and Advanced)
Presentational (Novice, Intermediate, and Advanced)

Presidents
2022: Victoria Russell
2021: Jessica Haxhi
2020: Bridget Yaden
2019: Lisa Ritter
2018: Aleidine Moeller
2017: Desa Dawson
2016: Pete Swanson
2015: Jacque Bott van Houten
2014: Mary Lynn Redmond
2013: Toni Theisen
2012:  David McAlpine
2011: Barbara Mondloch
2010: Eileen Glisan, Indiana University of Pennsylvania
2009: Janine Erickson
2008: Ray T. Clifford
2007: Rita A. Oleksak
2006: Paul Sandrock
2005: Audrey L. Heining-Boynton
2004: Thomas Keith Cothrun
2003: Martha G. Abbott
2002: Christine L. Brown
2001: Paul A. Garcia
1999: Emily Spinelli
1998: Elizabeth Hoffman
1997: Ann Tollefson
1996: Valorie S. Babb
1995: Kathleen M. Riordan
1994: Robert M. Terry
1993: Ray T. Clifford
1992: Gerard L. Ervin
1991: Lynn Sandstedt
1990: Diane Birckbichler
1989: Robert Ludwig
1988: Toby Tamarkin
1987: Jacqueline Beneveto
1986: Alice C. Omaggio-Hadley
1985: William N. Hatfield
1984: Helene Zimmer-Loew
1983: Robert Gilman
1982: Charles R. Hancock
1981: Thomas H. Geno
1980: Dale L. Lange
1979: Jane Bourque 
1978: Lorraine A. Strasheim
1977: Howard B. Altman
1976: Helene Warriner-Burke
1975: Frank M. Grittner
1974: Carl Dellacio
1973: Jermaine D. Arndt 
1972: Gail Hutchinson Eubanks 
1971: Lowell Dunham
1970: Lester McKim
1969: Leo Benardo
1968: Emma-Marie Birkmaier

Teacher of the Year
Each year the organization names the ACTFL National Language Teacher of the Year. The Teacher of the Year becomes a spokesperson for the language profession to increase the visibility of the importance of learning languages and cultures to the general public.

2022: Heather Sweetser, University of New Mexico, NM
2021: Elena Kamenetzky, Eastern High School, KY
2020: Rebecca Blouwolf
2019: Rebecca E. Aubrey, Ashford School, CT 
2018: Ying Jin, Cupertino High School, CA
2017: Katrina Griffin, North County High School, MD
2016: Edward Zarrow, Westwood High School, MA
2015: Nicole Naditz, Bella Vista High School, CA
2014: Linda Egnatz, Lincoln-Way Community High School, IL
2013: Noah Geisel, Denver East High School, CO
2012: Yo Azama, North Salinas High School, CA
2011: Clarissa Adams-Fletcher, Dunwoody High School, GA

The Language Educator
The Language Educator (TLE) magazine is ACTFL's membership publication. TLE is published quarterly with issues available to members in print and for digital download and via a mobile app.

See also
Task-based language learning
Common European Framework of Reference for Languages
Canadian language benchmarks
Defense Language Proficiency Tests
Oral Proficiency Interview
Language education in the United States

References

External links
Official website
ACTFL Proficiency Guidelines (2012)

Pedagogy
Language education in the United States
Educational organizations based in the United States
Non-profit organizations based in Alexandria, Virginia
Language tests